The United Kingdom's entry into the Eurovision Song Contest 1997 was "Love Shine a Light" by Katrina and the Waves. The entry was chosen during the UK selection show, The Great British Song Contest, hosted by Dale Winton on 9 March, with the results announced six days later. The UK went on to win the song contest which was being held in Dublin, Ireland, with an unprecedented 227 points. The 1997 contest is last win for the United Kingdom so far.

Before Eurovision

The Great British Song Contest 1997 
The Great British Song Contest 1997 was the national final developed by the BBC in order to select the British entry for the Eurovision Song Contest 1997. Eight acts competed in the competition which consisted of a radio semi-final on 7 February 1997 and a televised final on 9 March 1997.

Semi-final
On 7 February, a semifinal was held on BBC Radio 2 at 09:30am, presented by Ken Bruce. This featured eight songs. Radio 2 listeners voted at 10:00am and voting closed at 11:15am and the top 4 went forward to the televised final. In addition to the four listed above, the following were included, although the 4 acts not shaded in orange were eliminated:

Final
The Great British Song Contest final was held on Mother's Day, Sunday 9 March 1997 and televised on BBC 1 at 15:30pm. Gina G was special guest at the show. The final was hosted by Dale Winton. There was no simultaneous broadcast with Radio 2. The results were announced on The National Lottery Live on 15 March.

Each of the 4 finalists were featured each week on The National Lottery Live:

At Eurovision
Katrina and the Waves performed 24th in the running order on the night of the contest. "Love Shine a Light" went on to win the contest with 227 points. The UK was awarded 12 points (the highest possible) a total of 10 times.

Voting

References

Further reading 

 
 

1997
Countries in the Eurovision Song Contest 1997
Eurovision
Eurovision